Pakistan Refinery Limited (PRL) is a Pakistani oil refinery which is based in Karachi, Pakistan. Founded in May 1960, it is traded on the Pakistan Stock Exchange.

History
The company foundation stone was laid by the then Minister for Fuel, Power and Natural Resources in the late 1950s. Within 4 months, the profile of the refinery could be seen as it appears today. In addition to this construction at Korangi Creek, on the coastal belt of Karachi, a tank farm at Keamari Town, Karachi has been built to facilitate the storage and transfer of the crude oil from Karachi Port to this refinery. 

The plant came into operation in October 1962, two months ahead of schedule. The official opening of the refinery was done by Field Marshal Muhammad Ayub Khan, the then President of Pakistan on November 14, 1962. The design capacity of the refinery was 1 million tons of crude oil per annum but was increased to 2.1 million tons per annum later.

Company products
Pakistan Refinery refines and sells petroleum products. It has a capacity of refining 47,000 barrels per day of crude oil into a range of petroleum products. The refinery produces high speed diesel, furnace oil, motor spirit, Naphtha, kerosene, jet fuels and liquified petroleum gas. All the products are sold locally except for naphtha which is exported. Using its distribution network at Keamari, the finished products are supplied by the company to oil marketing companies of Pakistan – Shell Pakistan, Pakistan State Oil and Total Parco.

See also 

 List of oil refineries
 PARCO Coastal Refinery

References

External links 
 Pakistan Refinery Limited - official website

1960 establishments in Pakistan
Oil refineries in Karachi
Oil and gas companies of Pakistan
Companies listed on the Pakistan Stock Exchange
Formerly government-owned companies of Pakistan
Manufacturing companies based in Karachi